The Very Best of Steely Dan: Do It Again is a compilation album by Steely Dan, released in 1987.

Track listing
All songs are written and composed by Walter Becker and Donald Fagen.

"Rikki Don't Lose That Number"
"Reelin' in the Years"
"Kid Charlemagne"
"Doctor Wu"
"FM"
"My Old School"
"The Fez"
"Do It Again"
"Pretzel Logic"
"Any Major Dude Will Tell You"
"Black Friday"
"Show Biz Kids"
"Peg"
"Haitian Divorce"

1987 greatest hits albums
Steely Dan compilation albums